Satan is a 1920 silent German drama film in three parts, directed by F. W. Murnau, written and produced by Robert Wiene. It was one of Murnau's first directorial attempts, and along with his 1920 Der Januskopf, is today considered a lost film. The film starred Fritz Kortner, Sadjah Gezza and Conrad Veidt. Karl Freund was the cinematographer.

Only a brief fragment of the film is kept in the Cinémathèque Française film archive. Although most of the film no longer exists, it does not seem to be a true horror film, in that allegedly only the third segment of the film deals with the Devil. Robert Wiene probably had more control over the film than Murnau did, since he wrote the screenplay. Murnau hired Conrad Veidt to work with him in his next film, the 1920 Der Januskopf (which also featured Bela Lugosi).

Plot
The film is divided up into three separate short stories. The first segment involves a love triangle between an ancient Pharaoh named Amenhotep, Nouri (the girl he loves) and his young rival Jorab whom she loves. The second segment is an adaptation of Victor Hugo's Lucrezia Borgia. The third story deals with an idealistic young revolutionary named Hans Conrad, who is goaded into violence by a strange man named Grodski (Veidt), who seems to be Satan in human form. Only the third story appears to have had any supernatural overtones.

Cast
 Fritz Kortner as Pharao Amenhotep
 Sadjah Gezza as Nouri - die Fremde
 Ernst Hofmann as Jorab - der Hirt
 Margit Barnay as Phahi - die Frau des Pharao
 Else Berna as Lucrezia Borgia
 Kurt Ehrle as Gennaro
 Jaro Fürth as Rustinghella
 Ernst Stahl-Nachbaur as Prince Alfonso d'Este
 Martin Wolfgang as Hans Conrad
 Marija Leiko as Irene
 Elsa Wagner as Mother Conrad
 Max Kronert as Father Conrad
 Conrad Veidt as Lucifer / Hermit / Gubetta / Grodski

References

External links

1920 drama films
1920 films
Films directed by F. W. Murnau
Films of the Weimar Republic
German anthology films
German black-and-white films
1920s horror drama films
German horror drama films
German silent feature films
Lost German films
The Devil in film
Silent horror drama films
1920s German films